The Anglo-Saxon settlement of Britain is the process which changed the language and culture of most of what became England from Romano-British to Germanic. The Germanic-speakers in Britain, themselves of diverse origins, eventually developed a common cultural identity as Anglo-Saxons. This process principally occurred from the mid-fifth to early seventh centuries, following the end of Roman rule in Britain around the year 410. The settlement was followed by the establishment of the Heptarchy, Anglo-Saxon kingdoms in the south and east of Britain, later followed by the rest of modern England, and the south-east of modern Scotland. The exact nature of this change is a topic of on-going research. Questions remain about the scale, timing and nature of the settlements, and also about what happened to the previous residents of what is now England.

The available evidence includes the scant contemporary and near-contemporary written record, archaeological and genetic information. The few literary sources tell of hostility between incomers and natives. They describe violence, destruction, massacre, and the flight of the Romano-British population. Moreover, little clear evidence exists for any significant influence of British Celtic or British Latin on Old English. These factors suggested a mass influx of Germanic-speaking peoples. In this view, held by most historians and archaeologists until the mid-to-late 20th century, much of what is now England was cleared of its prior inhabitants. If this traditional viewpoint were to be correct, the genes of the later English people would have been overwhelmingly inherited from Germanic migrants.

However, another view, the most favoured among 21st-century scholars, is that the migrants were fewer, possibly centred on a warrior elite. This hypothesis suggests that the incomers achieved a position of political and social dominance, which, aided by intermarriage, initiated a process of acculturation of the natives to the incoming language and material culture. Archaeologists have found that settlement patterns and land use show no clear break with the Romano-British past, though changes in material culture were profound. This view predicts that the ancestry of the people of Anglo-Saxon and modern England would be largely derived from the Romano-British.

Even so, if these incomers established themselves as a social elite practising a level of endogamy, this could have allowed them enhanced reproductive success (the 'apartheid theory', named after the 20th-century apartheid system of South Africa). In this case, the prevalent genes of later Anglo-Saxon England could have been largely derived from moderate numbers of Germanic migrants. This theory, originating in an early population genetics study, has proven controversial, and has been critically received by many scholars. Genetic studies in the late 2010s and early 2020s have suggested that immigration from the Germanic-speaking Continent was on a greater scale than argued by supporters of the twenty-first century consensus, and also that marriages between native Britons and immigrants were more common than posited by proponents of the apartheid theory.

Background

By 400, the Roman provinces in Britain (all the territory to the south of Hadrian's Wall) were a peripheral part of the Roman Empire, occasionally lost to rebellion or invasion, but until then always eventually recovered. That cycle of loss and recapture collapsed over the next decade. Eventually, around 410, although Roman power remained a force to be reckoned with for a further three generations across much of Gaul, Britain slipped beyond direct imperial control into a phase which has generally been termed "sub-Roman".

The history of this period has traditionally been a narrative of decline and fall. However, evidence from Verulamium suggests that urban-type rebuilding, featuring piped water, was continuing late on in the fifth century, if not beyond. At Silchester, signs of sub-Roman occupation are found down to around 500, and at Wroxeter, new baths have been identified as of Roman-type.

The writing of Saint Patrick and Gildas (see below) demonstrates the survival in Britain of Latin literacy and Roman education, learning and law within elite society and Christianity, throughout the bulk of the fifth and sixth centuries. Also, signs in Gildas' works indicate that the economy was thriving without Roman taxation, as he complains of luxuria and self-indulgence. In the mid-fifth century, Anglo-Saxons begin to appear in an apparently still functionally Romanised Britain.

Historical evidence
The act of surveying the historical sources for signs of the Anglo-Saxon settlement assumes that the words Angles, Saxons, or Anglo-Saxon have the same meaning in all the sources. Assigning ethnic labels such as "Anglo-Saxon" is fraught with difficulties and the term only began to be used in the 8th century to distinguish "Germanic" groups in Britain from those on the continent (Old Saxony in present-day Northern Germany).

Early sources
The Chronica Gallica of 452 records for the year 441: "The British provinces, which to this time had suffered various defeats and misfortunes, are reduced to Saxon rule." The chronicle was written some distance from Britain. There is uncertainty about precise dates for fifth-century events especially before 446. This, however, does not undermine the position of the Gallic Chronicles as a very important contemporary source, which suggests that Bede's later date for 'the arrival of the Saxons' was mistaken. In the chronicle, Britain is grouped with four other Roman territories which came under 'Germanic' dominion around the same time, the list being intended as an explanation of the end of the Roman empire in the west. The four share a similar history, as they were all given into the "power of the barbarians" by Roman authority: three were deliberately settled with Germanic federates and though the Vandals took Africa by force their dominion was confirmed by treaty.

Procopius states that Brittia was settled by three nations: the Angili, Frissones, and Brittones, each ruled by its own king. Each nation was so prolific that it sent large numbers of individuals every year to the Franks, who planted them in unpopulated regions of its territory. Michael Jones, a historian at Bates College in New England, says that "Procopius himself, however, betrays doubts about this specific passage, and subsequent details in the chapter undermine its credibility as a clue to sixth-century population in Britain." Writing in the mid-sixth century, Procopius also states that after the overthrow of Constantine III in 411, "the Romans never succeeded in recovering Britain, but it remained from that time under tyrants."

Gildas' De Excidio et Conquestu Britanniae

In Gildas' work of the sixth century (perhaps 510–530), De Excidio et Conquestu Britanniae, a religious tract on the state of Britain, the Saxons were enemies originally from overseas, who brought well-deserved judgement upon the local kings or 'tyrants'.

The sequence of events in Gildas is:
 After an appeal to Aëtius (the Groans of the Britons) the Britons were gripped by famine while suffering attacks from the Picts and Scoti; some fought back successfully, leading to a period of peace.
 Peace led to luxuria and self-indulgence.
 A renewed attack was threatened by the Picts and Scoti, and this led to a council, where it was proposed and agreed that land in the east would be given to the Saxons on the basis of a treaty, a foedus, by which the Saxons would defend the Britons in exchange for food supplies. This type of arrangement was unexceptional in a Late Roman context; Franks had been settled as foederati on imperial territory in northern Gaul (Toxandria) in the fourth century, and the Visigoths were settled in Gallia Aquitania early in the fifth century. 
The Saxon foederati first complained that their monthly supplies were inadequate. Then they threatened to break the treaty, which they did, spreading the onslaught "from sea to sea".
 This war, which Higham called the "War of the Saxon Federates", ended some 20–30 years later, shortly after the siege at Mons Badonicus, and some 40 years before Gildas was born.
 A peace existed with the Saxons, who returned to their eastern home, which Gildas called a lugubre divortium barbarorum—a grievous divorce from the barbarians. The "divorce settlement", Higham in particular has argued, was a worse treaty from the British viewpoint. This included the payment of tribute to the people in the east (i.e. the Saxons), who were under the leadership of the person whom Gildas called pater diabolus.

Gildas used the correct late Roman term for the Saxons, foederati, people who came to Britain under a well-used treaty system. This kind of treaty had been used elsewhere to bring people into the Roman Empire to move along the roads or rivers and work alongside the army. Gildas called them Saxons, which was probably the common British term for the settlers. Gildas' use of the word patria, when used in relation to the Saxons and Picts, gave the impression that some Saxons could by then be regarded as native to Britannia.

Britain for Gildas was the whole island. Ethnicity and language were not his issue; he was concerned with the leaders' faith and actions. The historical details are, as Snyder had it: "by-products from his recounting of royal-sins". There is a strong tradition of Christian writers who were concerned with the moral qualities of leadership and Gildas joined these. He used apocalyptic language: for example the Saxons were "villains", "enemies", led by a Devil-father. Yet, Gildas had lived through, in his own words, an age of "external peace", and it is this peace that brought with it the tyrannis—"unjust rule".

Gildas' remarks reflected his continuing concern regarding the vulnerability of his countrymen and their disregard and in-fighting: for example, "it was always true of this people (as it is now) that it was weak in beating off the weapons of the enemy, but strong in putting up with civil war and the burden of sin." However, after the War of the Saxon Federates, if there were acts of genocide, mass exodus, or mass slavery, Gildas did not seem to know about them. Gildas, in discussing the holy shrines, mentioned that the spiritual life of Britain had suffered, because of the partition (divortium), of the country, which was preventing the citizens (cives) from worshipping at the shrines of the martyrs. Control had been ceded to the Saxons, even control of access to such shrines. The church was now 'tributary', her sons had 'embraced dung' and the nobility had lost their authority to govern.

Gildas described the corruption of the elite: "Britain has kings but they are tyrants; she has judges but they are wicked". This passage provides a glimpse into the world of Gildas, he continued: "they plunder and terrorise the innocent, they defend and protect the guilty and thieving, they have many wives, whores and adulteresses, swear false oaths, tell lies, reward thieves, sit with murderous men, despise the humble, their commanders are 'enemies of God'"; the list is long. Oath breaking and the absence of just judgements for ordinary people were mentioned a number of times. British leadership, everywhere, was immoral and the cause of the "ruin of Britain".

Bede's Historia ecclesiastica gentis Anglorum

Gildas and other sources were used by Bede in his Historia ecclesiastica gentis Anglorum, written around 731. Bede identifies the migrants as Angles, Saxons, and Jutes, reporting (Bk I, Ch 15) that the Saxons came from Old Saxony (Northern Germany) and the Angles from 'Anglia', which lay between the homelands of the Saxons and Jutes. Anglia is usually interpreted as the old Schleswig-Holstein Province (straddling the modern Danish-German border), and containing the modern Angeln. The coast between the Elbe and Weser rivers (modern German state of Lower Saxony) is the Saxon area of origin.  Jutland, the peninsula containing part of Denmark, was the homeland of the Jutes.

Bede seems to identify three phases of settlement: an exploration phase, when mercenaries came to protect the resident population; a migration phase, which was substantial, as implied by the statement that Anglus was deserted; and an establishment phase, in which Anglo-Saxons started to control areas, implied in Bede's statement about the origins of the tribes. This analysis of Bede has led to a re-evaluation, in terms of continuity and change, of Bede's "Northumbrian" view of history and how this view was projected back into the account of the latter two phases of settlement; and a possible overhaul of the traditional chronological framework.

The concept of Bretwalda originates in Bede's comment on who held the Imperium of Britain. From this concept, historians have inferred a formal institution of overlordship south of the Humber. Whether such an institution existed is uncertain, but Simon Keynes argues that the idea is not an invented concept. The Bretwalda concept is taken as evidence for a presence of a number of early Anglo-Saxon elite families. Whether the majority were early settlers, descendant from settlers, or especially after the exploration stage, were Roman-British leaders who adopted Anglo-Saxon culture, is unclear, but the balance of opinion is that most were migrants. Notable gaps include: no-one from the East or West Midlands is represented in the list of Bretwaldas, and some uncertainty about the dates of these leaders.

Bede's view of Britons is partly responsible for the picture of them as the downtrodden subjects of Anglo-Saxon oppression. This has been used by some linguists and archaeologists to produce invasion and settlement theories involving genocide, forced migration and enslavement. The depiction of the Britons in the Historia Ecclesiastica is influenced by the writing of Gildas, who viewed the Saxons as a punishment from God against the British people. Windy McKinney notes that "Bede focused on this point and extended Gildas' vision by portraying the pagan Anglo-Saxons not as God's scourge against the reprobate Britons, but rather as the agents of Britain's redemption. Therefore, the ghastly scenario that Gildas feared is calmly explained away by Bede; any rough treatment was necessary, and ordained by God, because the Britons had lost God's favour, and incurred his wrath." McKinney, who suggests that "Bede himself may not have been an ethnically 'pure' Angle," argues that his use of ethnic terms was "tied to the expression of tradition and religious ideas, to the loyalty of a people to authority, and subject to change as history continued to unfold. Therefore, it is a moot point whether all of those whom Bede encompassed under the term Angli were racially Germanic".

Tribal Hideage
The Tribal Hideage is a list of 35 tribes that was compiled in Anglo-Saxon England some time between the seventh and ninth centuries. The inclusion of the 'Elmet-dwellers' suggests to Simon Keynes that the Tribal Hideage was compiled in the early 670s, during the reign of King Wulfhere, since Elmet seems to have reverted thereafter to Northumbrian control.

It includes a number of independent kingdoms and other smaller territories and assigns a number of hides to each one. A hide was an amount of land sufficient to support a household. The list of tribes is headed by Mercia and consists almost exclusively of peoples who lived south of the Humber estuary and territories that surrounded the Mercian kingdom, some of which have never been satisfactorily identified by scholars. The document is problematic, but extremely important for historians, as it provides a glimpse into the relationship between people, land, and the tribes and groups into which they had organised themselves.

The individual units in the list developed from the settlement areas of tribal groups, some of which are as little as 300 hides. The names are difficult to locate: places such as East wixna and Sweord ora. What it reveals is that micro-identity of tribe and family is important from the start. The list is evidence for more complex settlement than the single political entity of the other historical sources.

Anglo-Saxon Chronicle
The Anglo-Saxon Chronicle is a historical record of events in Anglo-Saxon England, which was kept from the late 9th to the mid-12th century. The chronicle is a collection of annals that were still being updated in some cases more than 600 years after the events they describe. They contain various entries that seem to add to the breadth of the historical evidence and provide good evidence for a migration, the Anglo-Saxon elites, and various significant historical events.

The earliest events described in the Anglo-Saxon Chronicle were transcribed centuries after they had occurred. Barbara Yorke, Patrick Sims-Williams, and David Dumville, among others, have highlighted how a number of features of the Anglo-Saxon Chronicle for the fifth and early sixth centuries clearly contradict the idea that they contain a reliable year-by-year record. Stuart Laycock has suggested that some information describing the early period may be accepted as containing a kernel of truth if the obvious glosses and fictions are rejected (such as the information about Porta and Portsmouth). The sequence of the events associated with Ælle of Sussex seems plausible, whilst the dates are uncertain. However, presenting evidence for the Anglo-Saxon settlement from a chronicle such as the Anglo-Saxon Chronicle is uncertain and relies heavily on the present view of which entries are acceptable truth. As Dumville points out about the Anglo-Saxon Chronicle: "medieval historiography has assumptions different from our own, particularly in terms of distinctions between fiction and non-fiction".

Linguistic evidence

Explaining linguistic change, and particularly the rise of Old English, is crucial in any account of the Anglo-Saxon settlement of Britain. The modern consensus is that the spread of English can be explained by a minority of Germanic-speaking immigrants becoming politically and socially dominant, in a context where Latin had lost its usefulness and prestige due to the collapse of the Roman economy and administration.

The evidence 

All linguistic evidence from Roman Britain suggests that most inhabitants spoke British Celtic and/or British Latin. However, by the eighth century, when extensive evidence for the post-Roman language situation is next available, it is clear that the dominant language in what is now eastern and southern England was Old English, whose West Germanic predecessors were spoken in what is now the Netherlands and northern Germany. Old English then continued spreading westwards and northwards in the ensuing centuries. This development is strikingly different from, for example, post-Roman Gaul, Iberia, or North Africa, where Germanic-speaking invaders gradually switched to local languages. Old English shows little obvious influence from Celtic or spoken Latin: there are for example vanishingly few English words of Brittonic origin. Moreover, except in Cornwall, the vast majority of place-names in England are easily etymologised as Old English (or Old Norse, due to later Viking influence), demonstrating the dominance of English across post-Roman England. Intensive research in recent decades on Celtic toponymy has shown that more names in England and southern Scotland have Brittonic, or occasionally Latin, etymologies than was once thought, but even so, it is clear that Brittonic and Latin place-names in the eastern half of England are extremely rare, and although they are noticeably more common in the western half, they are still a tiny minority─2% in Cheshire, for example.

The debate 
Into the later twentieth century, scholars' usual explanation for the lack of Celtic influence on English, supported by uncritical readings of the accounts of Gildas and Bede, was that Old English became dominant primarily because Germanic-speaking invaders killed, chased away, and/or enslaved the previous inhabitants of the areas that they settled. In recent decades, a few specialists have continued to support this interpretation, and Peter Schrijver has said that 'to a large extent, it is linguistics that is responsible for thinking in terms of drastic scenarios' about demographic change in late Roman Britain.

But the consensus among experts today, influenced by research in contact linguistics, is that political dominance by a fairly small number of Old English-speakers could have driven large numbers of Britons to adopt Old English while leaving little detectable trace of this language-shift. The collapse of Britain's Roman economy and administrative structures seems to have left Britons living in a technologically similar society to their Anglo-Saxon neighbours, making it unlikely that Anglo-Saxons would need to borrow words for unfamiliar concepts. If Old English became the most prestigious language in a particular region, speakers of other languages may have found it advantageous to become bilingual and, over a few generations, stop speaking the less prestigious languages (in this case British Celtic and/or British Latin). This account, which demands only small numbers of politically dominant Germanic-speaking migrants to Britain, has become 'the standard explanation' for the gradual death of Celtic and spoken Latin in post-Roman Britain.

Likewise, scholars have posited various mechanisms other than massive demographic change by which pre-migration Celtic place-names could have been lost. Scholars have stressed that Welsh and Cornish place-names from the Roman period seem no more likely to survive than English ones: 'clearly name loss was a Romano-British phenomenon, not just one associated with Anglo-Saxon incomers'. Other explanations for the replacement of Roman period place-names include adaptation of Celtic names such that they now seem to come from Old English; a more gradual loss of Celtic names than was once assumed; and new names being coined (in the newly dominant English language) because instability of settlements and land-tenure.

Current research 
Extensive research is ongoing on whether British Celtic did exert subtle substrate influence on the phonology, morphology, and syntax of Old English (as well as on whether British Latin-speakers influenced the Brittonic languages, perhaps as they fled westwards from Anglo-Saxon domination into highland areas of Britain). These arguments have not yet, however, become consensus views. Thus a recent synthesis concludes that 'the evidence for Celtic influence on Old English is somewhat sparse, which only means that it remains elusive, not that it did not exist'.

Debate continues within a framework assuming that many Brittonic-speakers shifted to English, for example over whether at least some Germanic-speaking peasant-class immigrants must have been involved to bring about the language-shift; what legal or social structures (such as enslavement or apartheid-like customs) might have promoted the high status of English; and precisely how slowly Brittonic (and British Latin) disappeared in different regions.

An idiosyncratic view that has won extensive popular attention is Stephen Oppenheimer's suggestion that the lack of Celtic influence on English is because the ancestor of English was already widely spoken in Britain by the Belgae before the end of the Roman period. However, Oppenheimer's ideas have not been found helpful in explaining the known facts: there is no evidence for a well established Germanic language in Britain before the fifth century, and Oppenheimer's idea contradicts the extensive evidence for the use of Celtic and Latin.

Elite personal names

While many studies admit that a substantial survival of native British people from lower social strata is probable, with these people becoming anglicised over time due to the action of "elite dominance" mechanisms, there is also evidence for the survival of British elites and their anglicisation. An Anglo-Saxon elite could be formed in two ways: from an incoming chieftain and his war band from northern Germania taking over an area of Britain, or through a native British chieftain and his war band adopting Anglo-Saxon culture and language.

The incidence of British Celtic personal names in the royal genealogies of a number of "Anglo-Saxon" dynasties is very suggestive of the latter process. The Wessex royal line was traditionally founded by a man named Cerdic, an undoubtedly Celtic name identical to Ceretic, the name given to two British kings, and ultimately derived from the Brittonic *Caraticos. This may indicate that Cerdic was a native Briton, and that his dynasty became anglicised over time. A number of Cerdic's alleged descendants also possessed Celtic names, including the 'Bretwalda' Ceawlin. The last occurrence of a British name in this dynasty was that of King Caedwalla, who died as late as 689. The British name Caedbaed is found in the pedigree of the kings of Lindsey, which argues for the survival of British elites in this area also. In the Mercian royal pedigree, the name of King Penda and the names of other kings have more obvious Brittonic than Germanic etymologies, though they do not correspond to known Welsh personal names.

Bede, in his major work, charts the careers of four upper-class brothers in the English Church; he refers to them as being Northumbrian, and therefore "English". However, the names of Saint Chad of Mercia (a prominent bishop) and his brothers Cedd (also a bishop), Cynibil and Caelin (a variant spelling of Ceawlin) are British rather than Anglo-Saxon.

A good case can be made for southern Britain (especially Wessex, Kent, Essex and parts of Southern East Anglia), at least, having been taken over by dynasties having some Germanic ancestry or connections, but also having origins in, or intermarrying with, native British elites.

Archaeological evidence

Archaeologists seeking to understand evidence for migration and/or acculturation must first get to grips with early Anglo-Saxon archaeology as an "Archaeology of Identity". Guarding against considering one aspect of archaeology in isolation, this concept ensures that different topics are considered together, that previously were considered separately, including gender, age, ethnicity, religion, and status.

The task of interpretation has been hampered by the lack of works of archaeological synthesis for the Anglo-Saxon period in general, and the early period in particular. This is changing, with new works of synthesis and chronology, in particular the work of Catherine Hills and Sam Lucy on the evidence of Spong Hill, which has opened up the possible synthesis with continental material culture and has moved the chronology for the settlement earlier than AD 450, with a significant number of items now in phases before this historically set date.

Understanding the Roman legacy
Archaeological evidence for the emergence of both a native British identity and the appearance of a Germanic culture in Britain in the 5th and 6th centuries must consider first the period at the end of Roman rule. The collapse of Roman material culture some time in the early 5th century left a gap in the archaeological record that was quite rapidly filled by the intrusive Anglo-Saxon material culture, while the native culture became archaeologically close to invisible—although recent hoards and metal-detector finds show that coin use and imports did not stop abruptly at AD 410.

The archaeology of the Roman military systems within Britain is well known but is not well understood: for example, whether the Saxon Shore was defensive or to facilitate the passage of goods. Andrew Pearson suggests that the "Saxon Shore Forts" and other coastal installations played a more significant economic and logistical role than is often appreciated, and that the tradition of Saxon and other continental piracy, based on the name of these forts, is probably a myth.

The archaeology of late Roman (and sub-Roman) Britain has been mainly focused on the elite rather than the peasant and slave: their villas, houses, mosaics, furniture, fittings, and silver plates. This group had a strict code on how their wealth was to be displayed, and this provides a rich material culture, from which "Britons" are identified. There was a large gap between richest and poorest; the trappings of the latter have been the focus of less archaeological study. However the archaeology of the peasant from the 4th and 5th centuries is dominated by "ladder" field systems or enclosures, associated with extended families, and in the South and East of England, the extensive use of timber-built buildings and farmsteads shows a lower level of engagement with Roman building methods than is shown by the houses of the numerically much smaller elite.

Settler evidence

Confirmation of the use of Anglo-Saxons as foederati or federate troops has been seen as coming from burials of Anglo-Saxons wearing military equipment of a type issued to late Roman forces, which have been found both in late Roman contexts, such as the Roman cemeteries of Winchester and Colchester, and in purely 'Anglo-Saxon' rural cemeteries like Mucking (Essex), though this was at a settlement used by the Romano-British. The distribution of the earliest Anglo-Saxon sites and place names in close proximity to Roman settlements and roads has been interpreted as showing that initial Anglo-Saxon settlements were being controlled by the Romano-British.

Catherine Hills suggests it is not necessary to see all the early settlers as federate troops, and that this interpretation has been used rather too readily by some archaeologists. A variety of relationships could have existed between Romano-British and incoming Anglo-Saxons. The broader archaeological picture suggests that no one model will explain all the Anglo-Saxon settlements in Britain and that there was considerable regional variation. Settlement density varied within southern and eastern England. Norfolk has more large Anglo-Saxon cemeteries than the neighbouring East Anglian county of Suffolk; eastern Yorkshire (the nucleus of the Anglo-Saxon kingdom of Deira) far more than the rest of Northumbria. The settlers were not all of the same type. Some were indeed warriors who were buried equipped with their weapons, but we should not assume that all of these were invited guests who were to guard Romano-British communities. Possibly some, like the later Viking settlers, may have begun as piratical raiders who later seized land and made permanent settlements. Other settlers seem to have been much humbler people who had few if any weapons and suffered from malnutrition. These were characterised by Sonia Chadwick Hawkes as Germanic 'boat people', refugees from crowded settlements on the North Sea which deteriorating climatic conditions would have made untenable.

Tribal characteristics

Catherine Hills points out that it is too easy to consider Anglo-Saxon archaeology solely as a study of ethnology and to fail to consider that identity is "less related to an overall Anglo-Saxon ethnicity and more to membership of family or tribe, Christian or pagan, elite or peasant". "Anglo-Saxons" or "Britons" were no more homogeneous than nationalities are today, and they would have exhibited diverse characteristics: male/female, old/young, rich/poor, farmer/warrior—or even Gildas' patria (fellow citizens), cives (indigenous people) and hostes (enemies)—as well as a diversity associated with language. Beyond these, in the early Anglo-Saxon period, identity was local: although people would have known their neighbours, it may have been important to indicate tribal loyalty with details of clothing and especially fasteners. It is sometimes hard in thinking about the period to avoid importing anachronistic 19th-century ideas of nationalism: in fact it is unlikely that people would have thought of themselves as Anglo-Saxon – instead they were part of a tribe or region, descendants of a patron or followers of a leader. It is this identity that archaeological evidence seeks to understand and determine, considering how it might support separate identity groups, or identities that were inter-connected.

Part of a well-furnished pagan-period mixed, inhumation-cremation, cemetery at Alwalton near Peterborough was excavated in 1999. Twenty-eight urned and two unurned cremations dating from between the 5th and 6th centuries, and 34 inhumations, dating from between the late 5th and early 7th centuries, were uncovered. Both cremations and inhumations were provided with pyre or grave goods, and some of the burials were richly furnished. The excavation found evidence for a mixture of practices and symbolic clothing; these reflected local differences that appeared to be associated with tribal or family loyalty. This use of clothing in particular was very symbolic, and distinct differences within groups in the cemetery could be found.

Some recent scholarship has argued, however, that current approaches to the sociology of ethnicity render it extremely difficult, if not impossible, to demonstrate ethnic identity via purely archaeological means, and has thereby rejected the basis for using furnished inhumation or such clothing practices as the use of peplos dress, or particular artistic styles found on artefacts such as those found at Alwalton, for evidence of pagan beliefs, or cultural memories of tribal or ethnic affiliation.

Reuse of earlier monuments
The evidence for monument reuse in the early Anglo-Saxon period reveals a number of significant aspects of the practice. Ancient monuments were one of the most important factors determining the placing of the dead in the early Anglo-Saxon landscape. Anglo-Saxon secondary activity on prehistoric and Roman sites was traditionally explained in practical terms. These explanations, in the view of Howard Williams, failed to account for the numbers and types of monuments and graves (from villas to barrows) reused.

Anglo-Saxon barrow burials started in the late 6th century and continued into the early 8th century. Prehistoric barrows, in particular, have been seen as physical expressions of land claims and links to the ancestors, and John Shephard has extended this interpretation to Anglo-Saxon tumuli. Eva Thäte has emphasised the continental origins of monument reuse in post-Roman England, Howard Williams has suggested that the main purpose of this custom was to give sense to a landscape that the immigrants did not find empty.

In the 7th and 8th centuries, monument reuse became so widespread that it strongly suggests the deliberate location of burials of the elite next to visible monuments of the pre-Saxon past, but with 'ordinary' burial grounds of this phase also frequently being located next to prehistoric barrows. The relative increase of this kind of spatial association from the 5th/6th centuries to the 7th/8th centuries is conspicuous. Williams' analysis of two well-documented samples shows an increase from 32% to 50% of Anglo-Saxon burial sites in the Upper Thames region, and from 47% to 71% of Anglo-Saxon cemeteries excavated since 1945. Härke suggests that one of the contexts for the increasing reuse of monuments may be "the adoption by the natives of the material culture of the dominant immigrants".

Landscape archaeology
The Anglo-Saxons did not settle in an abandoned landscape on which they imposed new types of settlement and farming, as was once believed. By the late 4th century the English rural landscape was largely cleared and generally occupied by dispersed farms and hamlets, each surrounded by its own fields but often sharing other resources in common (called "infield-outfield cultivation"). Such fields, whether of prehistoric or Roman origin, fall into two very general types, found both separately and together: irregular layouts, in which one field after another had been added to an arable hub over many centuries; and regular rectilinear layouts, often roughly following the local topography, that had resulted from the large-scale division of considerable areas of land. Such stability was reversed within a few decades of the 5th century, as early "Anglo-Saxon" farmers, affected both by the collapse of Roman Britain and a climatic deterioration which reached its peak probably around 500, concentrated on subsistence, converting to pasture large areas of previously ploughed land. However, there is little evidence of abandoned arable land.

Evidence across southern and central England increasingly shows the persistence of prehistoric and Roman field layouts into and, in some cases throughout, the Anglo-Saxon period, whether or not such fields were continuously ploughed. Landscapes at Yarnton, Oxfordshire, and Mucking, Essex, remained unchanged throughout the 5th century, while at Barton Court, Oxfordshire, the 'grid of ditched paddocks or closes' of a Roman villa estate formed a general framework for the Anglo-Saxon settlement there. Similar evidence has been found at Sutton Courtenay, Berkshire. The Romano-British fields at Church Down in Chalton and Catherington, both in Hampshire, Bow Brickhill, Buckinghamshire, and Havering, Essex, were all ploughed as late as the 7th century.

Susan Oosthuizen has taken this further and establishes evidence that aspects of the "collective organisation of arable cultivation appear to find an echo in fields of pre-historic and Roman Britain": in particular, the open field systems, shared between a number of cultivators but cropped individually; the link between arable holdings and rights to common pasture land; in structures of governance and the duty to pay some of the surplus to the local overlord, whether in rent or duty. Together these reveal that kinship ties and social relations were continuous across the 5th and 6th centuries, with no evidence of the uniformity or destruction, imposed by lords, the savage action of invaders or system collapse. This has implications on how later developments are considered, such as the developments in the 7th and 8th centuries.

Landscape studies draw upon a variety of topographical, archaeological and written sources. There are major problems in trying to relate Anglo-Saxon charter boundaries to those of Roman estates for which there are no written records, and by the end of the Anglo-Saxon period there had been major changes to the organisation of the landscape which can obscure earlier arrangements. Interpretation is also hindered by uncertainty about late Roman administrative arrangements. Nevertheless, studies carried out throughout the country, in "British" as well as "Anglo-Saxon" areas, have found examples of continuity of territorial boundaries where, for instance, Roman villa estate boundaries seem to have been identical with those of medieval estates, as delineated in early charters, though settlement sites within the defined territory might shift. What we see in these examples is probably continuity of the estate or territory as a unit of administration rather than one of exploitation. Although the upper level of Roman administration based on towns seems to have disappeared during the 5th century, a subsidiary system based on subdivisions of the countryside may have continued.

The basis of the internal organisation of both the Anglo-Saxon kingdoms and those of their Celtic neighbours was a large rural territory which contained a number of subsidiary settlements dependent upon a central residence which the Anglo-Saxons called a villa in Latin and a tūn in Old English. These developments suggest that the basic infrastructure of the early Anglo-Saxon local administration (or the settlement of early kings or earls) was inherited from late Roman or Sub-Roman Britain.

Distribution of settlements
There are a number of difficulties in recognising early Anglo-Saxon settlements as migrant settlers. This in part is because most early rural Anglo-Saxon sites have yielded few finds other than pottery and bone. The use of aerial photography does not yield easily identifiable settlements, partly due to the dispersed nature of many of these settlements.

The distribution of known settlements also remains elusive with few settlements found in the West Midlands or North-West. Even in Kent, an area of rich early Anglo-Saxon archaeology, the number of excavated settlements is fewer than expected. However, in contrast the counties of Northamptonshire, Oxfordshire, Suffolk and Cambridgeshire are relatively rich in early settlements. These have revealed a tendency for early Anglo-Saxon settlements to be on the light soils associated with river terraces.

Many of the inland settlements are on rivers that had been major navigation routes during the Roman era. These sites, such as Dorchester on Thames on the upper Thames,  were readily accessible by the shallow-draught, clinker-built boats used by the Anglo-Saxons. The same is true of the settlements along the rivers Ouse, Trent, Witham, Nene and along the marshy lower Thames. Less well known due to a dearth of physical evidence but attested by surviving place names, there were Jutish settlements on the Isle of Wight and the nearby southern coast of  Hampshire.

A number of Anglo-Saxon settlements are located near or at Roman-era towns, but the question of simultaneous town occupation by the Romano-Britons and a nearby Anglo-Saxon settlement (i.e., suggesting a relationship) is not confirmed. At Roman Caistor-by-Norwich, for example, recent analysis suggests that the cemetery post-dates the town's virtual abandonment.

Cemetery evidence

The earliest cemeteries that can be classified as Anglo-Saxon are found in widely separate regions and are dated to the early 5th century. The exception is in Kent, where the density of cemeteries and artefacts suggest either an exceptionally heavy Anglo-Saxon settlement, or continued settlement beginning at an early date, or both. By the late 5th century there were additional Anglo-Saxon cemeteries, some of them adjacent to earlier ones, but with a large expansion in other areas, and now including the southern coast of Sussex.

Up to the year 2000, roughly 10,000 early 'Anglo-Saxon' cremations and inhumations had been found, exhibiting a large degree of diversity in styles and types of mortuary ritual. This is consistent with evidence for many micro cultures and local practice. Cemetery evidence is still dominated by the material culture: finds of clothes, jewellery, weapons, pots, and personal items; but physical and molecular evidence from skeletons, bones, and teeth are increasingly important.
 
Considering the early cemeteries of Kent, most relevant finds come from furnished graves with distinctive links to the Continent. However, there are some unique items, these include pots and urns and especially brooches, an important element of female dress that functioned as a fastener, rather like a modern safety pin. The style of brooches (called Quoits), is unique to southern England in the fifth century AD, with the greatest concentration of such items occurring in Kent. Seiichi Suzuki defines the style through an analysis of its design organisation, and, by comparing it with near-contemporary styles in Britain and on the continent, identifying those features which make it unique. He suggests that the quoit brooch style was made and remade as part of the process of construction of new group identities during the political uncertainties of the time, and sets the development of the style in the context of the socio-cultural dynamics of an emergent post-Roman society. The brooch shows that culture was not just transposed from the continent, but from an early phase a new "Anglo-Saxon" culture was being developed.

Women's fashions (native costumes not thought to have been trade goods), have been used to distinguish and identify settlers, supplemented by other finds that can be related to specific regions of the Continent. A large number of Frankish artefacts have been found in Kent, and these are largely interpreted to be a reflection of trade and commerce rather than early migration. Yorke (Wessex in the Early Middle Ages, 1995), for example, only allows that some Frankish settlement is possible. Frankish sea raiding was recorded as early as 260 and became common for the next century, but their raids on Britain ended c. 367 as Frankish interest turned southward and was thereafter focused on the control and occupation of northern Gaul and Germania.

The presence of artefacts that are identifiably North Germanic along the coastal areas between the Humber Estuary and East Anglia indicates that Scandinavians migrated to Britain. However, this does not suggest that they arrived at the same time as the Angles: they may have arrived almost a century later, and their status and influence upon arrival is uncertain. In particular, regarding a significant Swedish influence in association with the Sutton Hoo ship and a Swedish origin for the East Anglian Wuffinga dynasty, both possibilities are now considered uncertain.

The process of mixing and assimilation of immigrant and native populations is virtually impossible to elucidate with material culture, but the skeletal evidence may shed some light on it. The 7th/8th-century average stature of male individuals in Anglo-Saxon cemeteries dropped by 15 mm ( in) compared with the 5th/6th-century average. This development is most marked in Wessex where the average dropped by 24 mm (1 in). This drop is not easily explained by environmental changes; there is no evidence for a change in diet in the 7th/8th centuries, nor is there any evidence of a further influx of immigrants at this time. Given the lower average stature of Britons, the most likely explanation would be a gradual Saxonisation or Anglicisation of the material culture of native enclaves, an increasing assimilation of native populations into Anglo-Saxon communities, and increasing intermarriage between immigrants and natives within Anglo-Saxon populations. Skeletal material from the Late Roman and Early Anglo-Saxon period from Hampshire was directly compared. It was concluded that the physical type represented in urban Roman burials, was not annihilated nor did it die-out, but it continued to be well represented in subsequent burials of Anglo-Saxon date.

At Stretton-on-Fosse II (Warwickshire), located on the western fringes of the early Anglo-Saxon settlement area, the proportion of male adults with weapons is 82%, well above the average in southern England. Continuity of the native female population at this site has been inferred from the continuity of textile techniques (unusual in the transition from the Romano-British to the Anglo-Saxon periods), and by the continuity of epigenetic traits from the Roman to the Anglo-Saxon burials. At the same time, the skeletal evidence demonstrates the appearance in the post-Roman period of a new physical type of males who are more slender and taller than the men in the adjacent Romano-British cemeteries. Taken together, the observations suggest the influx of a group of males, probably most or all of them Germanic, who took control of the local community and married native women. It is not easy to confirm such cases of 'warband' settlement in the absence of detailed skeletal, and other complementary, information, but assuming that such cases are indicated by very high proportions of weapon burials, this type of settlement was much less frequent than the kin group model.

Nick Higham outlines the main questions: 
"It is fairly clear that most Anglo-Saxon cemeteries are unrepresentative of the whole population, and particularly the whole age range. This was, therefore, a community which made decisions about the disposal of the dead based upon various factors, but at those we can barely guess. Was the inclusion of some but not all individuals subject to political control, or cultural screening? Was this a mark of ethnicity or did it represent a particular kinship, real or constructed, or the adherents of a particular cult? Was it status specific, with the rural proletariat – who would have been the vast majority of the population – perhaps excluded? So are many of these cemeteries associated with specific, high-status households and weighted particularly towards adult members? We do not know, but the commitment of particular parts of the community to an imported and in some senses 'Germanic', cremation ritual does seem to have been considerable, and is something which requires explanation."

Molecular evidence
Researchers have employed various forms of molecular evidence to investigate the relative importance of immigration, the acculturation of natives and inter-marriage in the creation of Anglo-Saxon England.

Y-chromosome evidence
The inheritance of sex-specific elements of the human genome allows the study of separate female-only and male-only lineages, using mitochondrial DNA and Y-chromosome DNA, respectively. Mitochondrial DNA ("mtDNA") and Y-chromosome DNA differ from the DNA of diploid nuclear chromosomes in that they are not formed from the combination of both parents' genes. Rather, males inherit the Y-chromosome directly from their fathers, and both sexes inherit mtDNA directly from their mothers. Consequently, they preserve a genetic record from person to descendant that is altered only through mutation. 

An examination of Y-chromosome variation, sampled in an east–west transect across England and Wales, was compared with similar samples taken in Friesland (East and West Fresia). It was selected for the study due to it being regarded as a source of Anglo-Saxon migrants, and because of the similarities between Old English and Frisian. Samples from Norway were also selected, as this is a source of the later Viking migrations. It found that in England, in small population samples, 50% to 100% of paternal genetic inheritance was derived from people originating in the Germanic coastlands of the North Sea.

Other research, also published in 2003 taken from a larger sample population and from more UK populations suggested that in southernmost England including Kent, continental (North German and Danish) paternal genetic input ranged between 25% and 45%, with a mean of 37%. East Anglia, the East Midlands, and Yorkshire all had over 50%. Across the latter much Viking settlement is attested. The study could not distinguish between North German and Danish populations, thus the relative proportions of genetic input derived from the Anglo-Saxon settlements and later Danish Viking colonisation could not be ascertained. The mean value of Germanic genetic input in this study was calculated at 54 percent.

A paper by Thomas et al. developed an "apartheid-like social structure" theory to explain how a small proportion of settlers could have made a larger contribution to the modern gene pool. This view has been criticized by JE Pattison, who suggested that the Y-chromosome evidence could still support the idea of a small settlement of people without the apartheid-like structures. It has been proposed, too, that the genetic similarities between people on either side of the North Sea may reflect a cumulative process of population movement, possibly beginning well before the historically attested formation of the Anglo-Saxons or the invasions of the Vikings. The 'apartheid theory' has received a considerable body of critical comment, especially the genetic studies from which it derives its rationale. Problems with the design of Weale's study and the level of historical naïveté evidenced by some population genetics studies have been particularly highlighted.

Stephen Oppenheimer reviewed the Weale and Capelli studies and suggested that correlations of gene frequency mean nothing without a knowledge of the genetic prehistory of the regions in question. His criticism of these studies is that they generated models based on the historical evidence of Gildas and Procopius, and then selected methodologies to test against these populations. Weale's transect spotlights that Belgium is further west in the genetic map than North Walsham, Asbourne and Friesland. In Oppenheimer's view, this is evidence that the Belgae and other continental people – and hence continental genetic markers indistinguishable from those ascribed to Anglo-Saxons – arrived earlier and were already strong in the 5th century in particular regions or areas. Oppenheimer, basing his research on the Weale and Capelli studies, maintains that none of the invasions following the Romans have had a significant impact on the gene pool of the British Isles, and that the inhabitants from prehistoric times belong to an Iberian genetic grouping. He says that most people in the British Isles are genetically similar to the Basque people of northern Spain and southwestern France, from 90% in Wales to 66% in East Anglia. Oppenheimer suggests that the division between the West and the East of England is not due to the Anglo-Saxon invasion but originates with two main routes of genetic flow – one up the Atlantic coast, the other from neighbouring areas of Continental Europe – which occurred just after the Last Glacial Maximum. Bryan Sykes, a former geneticist at Oxford University, came to fairly similar conclusions as Oppenheimer.

More recent work has challenged the theories of Oppenheimer and Sykes. David Reich's Harvard laboratory found that over 90% of the British Neolithic population was overturned by the Bell Beaker People from the Lower Rhine, who had little genetic relation to the Iberians or other southern Europeans. Modern autosomal genetic clustering is testament to this fact, as the British and Irish cluster genetically very closely with other North European populations, rather than Iberians, Galicians, Basques or those from the south of France. Further, more recent research (see below) has broadly supported the idea that genetic differences between the English and the Welsh have origins in the settlement of the Anglo-Saxons rather than prehistoric migration events.

Ancient DNA, rare alleles, and whole genome sequencing

Modern population studies
A major study in 2015 by Leslie et al. on "The fine scale genetic structure of the British population" revealed regional patterns of genetic differentiation, with genetic clusters reflecting historical demographic events and sometimes corresponding to the geographic boundaries of historical polities. Based on two separate analyses, the study found clear evidence in modern England of the Anglo-Saxon migration and identified the regions not carrying genetic material from these migrations. The authors argued that the proportion of "Saxon" ancestry in Central/Southern England was probably in the range 10%–40%. Additionally, in the "non-Saxon" parts of the UK they found various genetic subgroups rather than a homogenous "Celtic" population.

Ancient DNA studies
In 2016, through the investigation of burials in Cambridgeshire using ancient DNA techniques, researchers found evidence of intermarriage in the earliest phase of Anglo-Saxon settlement. The highest status grave of the burials investigated, as evidenced by the associated goods, was that of a female of local, British, origins; two other women were of Anglo-Saxon origin, and another showed signs of mixed ancestry. People of native, immigrant, and mixed ancestry were buried in the same cemetery, with grave goods from the same material culture, without any discernible distinction. The authors remark that their results run contrary to previous theories that have postulated strict reproductive segregation between natives and incomers. By studying rare alleles and employing whole genome sequencing, it was claimed that the continental and insular origins of the ancient remains could be discriminated, and it was calculated that a range of 25–40% of the ancestry of modern Britons is attributable to continental 'Anglo-Saxon' origins. The breakdown of the estimates given in this work into the modern populations of Britain determined that the population of eastern England is consistent with 38% Anglo-Saxon ancestry on average, with a large spread from 25 to 50%, and the Welsh and Scottish samples are consistent with 30% Anglo-Saxon ancestry on average, again with a large spread. The study also found that there is a small but significant difference between the mean values in the three modern British sample groups, with East English samples sharing slightly more alleles with the Dutch, and Scottish samples looking more like the Iron Age (Celtic) samples.

Another 2016 study analyzed nine ancient genomes of individuals from northern Britain, with seven from a Roman-era cemetery in York, and the others from earlier Iron-Age and later Anglo-Saxon burials. Six of the Roman genomes showed affinity with modern British Celtic populations, such as the Welsh, but were significantly different from eastern English samples. They also were similar to the earlier Iron-Age genome, suggesting population continuity, but differed from the later Anglo-Saxon genome, which was found to be similar to the samples from East Anglia, as well as other Anglo-Saxon era burials in Cambridgeshire (see above). This pattern was found to support a profound impact of migrations in the Anglo-Saxon period. The authors commented that the English population showed variation, with samples from the east and south showing greater similarity with the Anglo-Saxon burials and those in the north and west being closer to the Roman and Iron Age burials.

A third study, focused on the genetics of Ireland, combined the ancient data from both of the preceding studies and compared it to a large number of modern samples from across Britain and Ireland. This study found that modern southern, central and eastern English populations were of "a predominantly Anglo-Saxon-like ancestry", while those from northern and southwestern England had a greater degree of indigenous origin.

A 2020 study, which used DNA from hundreds of Viking-era burials in various regions across Europe, found that modern English samples showed a 38% genetic contribution on average from a native British "North Atlantic" population and a 37% contribution from a Danish-like population. The researchers estimated that up to 6% of the latter signature could have been derived from Danish Vikings, with the rest being attributed to the Anglo-Saxons.

A 2022 study focusing specifically on the question of the Anglo-Saxon settlement sampled 460 northwestern European individuals dated to the medieval period. The study concluded that in eastern England, large-scale immigration, including both men and women, occurred in the post-Roman era, with up to 76% of the ancestry of these individuals deriving from the North Sea coast area of continental Europe. The authors also noted that while a large proportion of the ancestry of the present-day English derives from the Anglo-Saxon migration event, it has been diluted by later migration from a population source similar to that of Iron Age France. On the implications of the study's findings, archaeologist Duncan Sayer, one of the authors of the study, commented: "There's been this ongoing conversation in archaeology for quite some time about the nature of the migration. Is it a mass migration? Is an elite migration? Was there even a migration? [...] What [this data] says is, yes, there is mass migration. You can't argue with that any more. So what we could do is start to talk about what that migration actually is and who the people are and how they interact and how they build communities."

Isotope analysis
Isotope analysis has begun to be employed to help answer the uncertainties regarding Anglo-Saxon migration; this can indicate whether an individual had always lived near his burial location. However, such studies cannot clearly distinguish ancestry. Thus, a descendant of migrants born in Britain would appear indistinguishable from somebody of native British origin.

Strontium data in a 5th–7th-century cemetery in West Heslerton implied the presence of two groups: one of "local" and one of "nonlocal" origin. Although the study suggested that they could not define the limits of local variation and identify immigrants with confidence, they could give a useful account of the issues. Oxygen and strontium isotope data in an early Anglo-Saxon cemetery at Wally Corner, Berinsfield in the Upper Thames Valley, Oxfordshire, found only 5.3% of the sample originating from continental Europe, supporting the hypothesis of acculturation. Furthermore, they found that there was no change in this pattern over time, except amongst some females. Another isotope test, conducted in 2018 from skeletons found near Eastbourne in Sussex, concluded that neither the traditional invasion model nor the elite acculturation model was applicable. The study found a large number of migrants, both male and female, who seemed to be less wealthy than the natives. There was evidence of continued migration throughout the early Anglo-Saxon period.

Another isotopic method has been employed to investigate whether protein sources in human diets in the early Anglo-Saxon varied with geographic location, or with respect to age or sex. This would provide evidence for social advantage. The results suggest that protein sources varied little according to geographic location and that terrestrial foods dominated at all locations.

Criticism

Some scholars have questioned whether it is legitimate to conflate ethnic and cultural identity with patterns highlighted by molecular evidence at all. A 2018 editorial for Nature argued that simplistic use of this category of data risks resembling the 'Culture-History' model of archaeological scholarship deployed in the early twentieth century, but which many present-day archaeologists consider to be problematic: for example the question of whether "Germanic" peoples can be considered to have shared any form of cultural or ethnic unity outside of their construction in Roman ethnography is far from settled, with some scholars expressing doubt that "Germanic" peoples had any strong sense of cultural affinity outside of speaking languages in the same language family.

Migration and acculturation theories

Various scholars have used a synthesis of evidence to present models to suggest an answer to the questions that surround the Anglo-Saxon settlement. These questions include how many migrants there were, when the Anglo-Saxons gained political ascendency, and what happened to the Romano-British people in the areas they took over. The later Anglo-Saxons were a mix of invaders, migrants and acculturated indigenous people. The ratios and relationships between these formative elements at the time of the Anglo-Saxon settlement are the subject of enquiry. The traditional interpretation of the settlement of Britain has been subject to profound reappraisal, with scholars embracing the evidence for both migration and acculturation.  Heinrich Härke explains the nature of this agreement:

It is now widely accepted that the Anglo-Saxons were not just transplanted Germanic invaders and settlers from the Continent, but the outcome of insular interactions and changes. But we are still lacking explicit models that suggest how this ethnogenetic process might have worked in concrete terms.

Estimating continental migrants' numbers
Knowing the number of migrants who came from the continent provides a context from which scholars can build an interpretation framework and understanding of the events of the 5th and 6th centuries. Robert Hedges in discussing this point observes that "archaeological evidence only addresses these issues indirectly." The traditional methodology used by archaeology to estimate the number of migrants starts with a figure for the population in Roman Britannia in the 3rd and 4th centuries. This is usually estimated at between 2 and 4 million. From this figure, Heinrich Härke and Michael Wood have argued that taking into account declines associated with political collapses, the population of what was to become Anglo-Saxon England had fallen to 1 million by the fifth century.

Within 200 years of their first arrival, the settlement density has been established as an Anglo-Saxon village every , in the areas where evidence has been gathered. Given that these settlements are typically of around 50 people, this implies an Anglo-Saxon population in southern and eastern England of 250,000. The number of migrants therefore depends on the population increase variable. If the population rose by 1 percent per year (slightly less than the present world population growth rate), this would suggest a migrant figure of 30,000. However, if the population rose by 2 percent per year (similar to India in the last 20 years), the migrant figure would be closer to 5,000. The excavations at Spong Hill revealed over 2,000 cremations and inhumations in what is a very large early cemetery. However, when the period of use is taken into account (over 200 years) and its size, it is presumed to be a major cemetery for the entire area and not just one village; such findings point to a smaller rather than larger number of original immigrants, possibly around 20,000.

Härke concluded that "most of the biological and cultural evidence points to a minority immigration on the scale of 10 to 20% of the native population. The immigration itself was not a single 'invasion', but rather a series of intrusions and immigrations over a considerable period, differing from region to region, and changing over time even within regions. The total immigrant population may have numbered somewhere between 100,000 and 200,000 over about a century, but the geographical variations in numbers, and in social and ethnic composition, should have led to a variety of settlement processes."

However, there is a discrepancy between, on the one hand, some archaeological and historical ideas about the scale of the Anglo-Saxon immigration, and on the other, estimates of the genetic contribution of the Anglo-Saxon immigrants to the modern English gene pool (see "Molecular evidence" above). Härke, Mark Thomas, and Michael Stumpf created a statistical study of those who held the "migrant" Y chromosomes and those that did not, and examined the effect of differential reproductive success between those groups, coupled with limited intermarriage between the groups, on the spread of the genetic variant to discover whether the levels of migration needed to meet a 50% contribution to the modern gene pool had been attained. Their findings demonstrated that a genetic pool can rise from less than 5% to more than 50% in as little as 200 years with the addition of a slight increase in reproduction advantage of 1.8 (meaning a ratio 51.8 to 50) and restricting the amount of female (migrant genes) and male (indigenous genes) inter-breeding to at most 10%.

Generally, however, the problems associated with seeking estimates for the population before AD 1089 were set out by Thomas, Stumpf, and Härke, who write that "incidental reports of numbers of immigrants are notoriously unreliable, and absolute numbers of immigrants before the Norman period can only be calculated as a proportion of the estimated overall population." Recent isotope and genetic evidence has suggested that migration continued over several centuries, possibly allowing for significantly more new arrivals than has been previously thought.

Saxon political ascendancy in Britain

A re-evaluation of the traditional picture of decay and dissolution in post-Roman Britain has occurred, with sub-Roman Britain being thought to have been more a part of the Late Antique world of western Europe than was customary a half century ago. As part of this re-evaluation some suggest that sub-Roman Britain, in its entirety, retained a significant political, economic and military momentum across the fifth century and even the bulk of the sixth. This in large part stems from attempts to develop visions of British success against the incoming Anglo-Saxons, as suggested by the Chronicles which were written in the ninth and mid-tenth century. However, recent scholarship has contested the extent to which either can be credited with any level of historicity regarding the decades around AD 500.
 
The representation of long-lasting British triumphs against the Saxons appears in large parts of the Chronicles, but stems ultimately from Gildas's brief and elusive reference to a British victory at Mons Badonicus – Mount Badon (see historical evidence above). Nick Higham suggests that the war between Britons and Saxons seems to have ended in some sort of compromise, which conceded a very considerable sphere of influence within Britain to the incomers. Kenneth Dark, on the other hand, has argued for a continuation of British political, cultural and military power well into the latter part of the sixth century, even in the eastern part of the country. Dark's argument rests on the very uneven distribution of Anglo-Saxon cemeteries and the proposition that large gaps in that distribution necessarily represent strong British polities which excluded Anglo-Saxon settlers by force. Cremation cemeteries in eastern Britain north of the Thames begin during the second quarter of the fifth century, backed up by new archaeological phases before 450 (see Archaeological evidence above). The chronology of this "adventus" of cremations is supported by the Gallic Chronicle of 452, which states that wide parts of Britain fell under Saxon rule in 441.

Romano-Britons' fate in the south-east
Multiple theories have been proposed as to the reason behind the invisibility of the Romano-Britons in the archaeological and historical records of the Anglo-Saxon period.

One theory, first set out by Edward Augustus Freeman, suggests that the Anglo Saxons and the Britons were competing cultures, and that through invasion, extermination, slavery, and forced resettlement the Anglo-Saxons defeated the Britons and consequently their culture and language prevailed. This view has influenced much of the scholarly and popular perceptions of the process of anglicisation in Britain. It remains the starting point and 'default position', to which other hypotheses are compared in modern reviews of the evidence. Widespread extermination and displacement of the native peoples of Britain is still considered a viable possibility by a number of scholars.  Such a view is broadly supported by the linguistic and toponymic evidence, as well as the few primary sources from the time.

Another theory has challenged this view and proposes that the Anglo-Saxon migration was an elite takeover, similar to the Norman Conquest, rather than a large-scale migration, and that the bulk of the population was composed of Britons who adopted the culture of the conquerors. Bryan Ward-Perkins argues that while "culturally, the later Anglo-Saxons and English did emerge as remarkably un-British, ... their genetic, biological make-up is none the less likely to have been substantially, indeed predominantly, British". Within this theory, two processes leading to Anglo-Saxonisation have been proposed. One is similar to culture changes observed in Russia, North Africa and parts of the Islamic world, where a politically and socially powerful minority culture becomes, over a rather short period, adopted by a settled majority. This  process is usually termed 'elite dominance'. The second process is explained through incentives, such as the wergild outlined in the law code of Ine of Wessex. The wergild of an Englishman was set at a value twice that of a Briton of similar wealth. However, some Britons could be very prosperous and own five hides of land, which gave thegn-like status, with a wergild of 600 shillings. Ine set down requirements to prove guilt or innocence, both for his English subjects and for his British subjects, who were termed 'foreigners/wealas' ('Welshmen'). The difference in status between the Anglo-Saxons and Britons could have produced an incentive for a Briton to become Anglo-Saxon or at least English speaking.

While most scholars currently accept a degree of population continuity from the Roman period, this view has not gone without criticism. Stefan Burmeister notes that "to all appearances, the settlement was carried out by small, agriculturally-oriented kinship groups. This process corresponds most closely with a classic settler model. The absence of early evidence of a socially demarcated elite underscores the supposition that such an elite did not play a substantial role. Rich burials such as are well-known from Denmark have no counterparts in England until the 6th century." Richard Coates points out that linguistically, "the case of the Britons in England appears consistent with the withdrawal of speakers of the previously dominant language, rather than the assimilation of the dominant classes by the incomers."

Several theories have been proposed by which numbers of native Britons could have been lowered without resorting to violent means. There is linguistic and historical evidence for a significant movement of Brittonic-speakers to Armorica, which became known as Brittany. Meanwhile, it has been speculated that plagues arriving through Roman trade links could have disproportionately affected the Britons.

Regional variation in settlement patterns
In recent years, scholars have sought to combine elements of the mass migration and elite dominance models, emphasizing that no single explanation can be used to account for cultural change across the entirety of England. Heinrich Härke writes that "the Anglo-Saxon migration [was] a process rather than an event, with implications for variations of the process over time, resulting in chronological and geographical diversity of immigrant groups, their origins, composition, sizes and settlement areas in Britain. These variations are, to a certain extent, reported in the written sources." According to Toby Martin, "Regional variation may well provide the key to resolution, with something more akin to mass migration in the south-east, gradually spreading into elite dominance in the north and west." This view has support in the toponymic evidence. In the southeastern counties of England, Brittonic place names are nearly nonexistent, but moving north and west, they gradually increase in frequency.

East Anglia has been identified by a number of scholars, including Härke, Martin, Catherine Hills, and Kenneth Dark, as a region in which a large-scale continental migration occurred, possibly following a period of depopulation in the fourth century. Lincolnshire has also been cited by Hills and Martin as a key centre of early settlement from the continent. Alexander Mirrington argues that in Essex, the cultural change seen in the archaeological record is so complete that "a migration of a large number of people is the most logical and least extreme solution." In Kent, according to Sue Harrington and Stuart Brookes, "the weight of archaeological evidence and that from literary sources favours migrations" as the main reason for cultural change.

Immigration into the area that was to become Wessex occurred from both the south coast and the Upper Thames valley. The earlier, southern settlements may have been more prosaic than descriptions in the Anglo-Saxon Chronicle imply. Jillian Hawkins suggests that powerful Romano-British trading ports around the Solent were able to direct significant numbers of Germanic settlers inland into areas such as the Meon valley, where they formed their own communities. In areas that were settled from the Thames, different processes may have been at play, with the Germanic immigrants holding a greater degree of power. Bruce Eagles argues that the later population of areas such as Wiltshire would have included large numbers of Britons who had adopted the culture of the socially dominant Saxons, while also noting that "it seems reasonable to consider that there must have been sufficient numbers of widely dispersed immigrants to bring about this situation in a relatively short space of time."

In the northern kingdom of Bernicia, however, Härke states that "a small group of immigrants may have replaced the native British elite and took over the kingdom as a going concern." Linguist Frederik Kortlandt agrees, commenting that in this region "there was a noticeable Celtic contribution to art, culture and possibly socio-military organization. It appears that
the immigrants took over the institutions of the local population here." In a study of place names in northeastern England and southern Scotland, Bethany Fox concluded that the immigration that did occur in this region was centred on the river valleys, such as those of the Tyne and the Tweed, with the Britons moving to the less fertile hill country and becoming acculturated over a longer period.

Aspects of the success of the Anglo-Saxon settlement
The reasons for the success of Anglo-Saxon settlements remain uncertain. Helena Hamerow has made an observation that in Anglo-Saxon society "local and extended kin groups remained ... the essential unit of production throughout the Anglo-Saxon period". "Local and extended kin groups" is one of a number of possible reasons for success, along with societal advantages, freedom and the relationship to an elite, that allowed the Anglo-Saxons' culture and language to flourish in the fifth and sixth centuries.

Anglo-Saxon political formation
Nick Higham is convinced that the success of the Anglo-Saxon elite in gaining an early compromise shortly after the Battle of Badon is a key to the success of the culture. This produced a political ascendancy across the south and east of Britain, which in turn required some structure to be successful.

The Bretwalda concept is taken as evidence for a presence of a number of early Anglo-Saxon elite families and a clear unitary oversight. Whether the majority of these leaders were early settlers, descendant from settlers, or especially after the exploration stage they were Roman-British leaders who adopted Anglo-Saxon culture is unclear. The balance of opinion is that most were migrants, although it should not be assumed they were all Germanic. There is agreement that these were small in number and proportion, yet large enough in power and influence to ensure "Anglo-Saxon" acculturation in the lowlands of Britain. Most historians believe these elites were those named by Bede, the Anglo-Saxon Chronicle and others, although there is discussion regarding their floruit dates. Importantly, whatever their origin or when they flourished, they established their claim to lordship through their links to extended kin ties. As Helen Geake jokingly points out "they all just happened to be related back to Woden".

The Tribal Hidage is evidence of the existence of numerous smaller provinces, meaning that southern and eastern Britain may have lost any macro-political cohesion in the fifth and sixth centuries and fragmented into many small autonomous units, though late Roman administrative organisation of the countryside may have helped dictate their boundaries. By the end of the sixth century the leaders of these communities were styling themselves kings, with the majority of the larger kingdoms based on the south or east coasts. They include the provinces of the Jutes of Hampshire and Wight, the South Saxons, Kent, the East Saxons, East Angles, Lindsey and (north of the Humber) Deira and Bernicia. Several of these kingdoms may have their foundation the former Roman civitas and this has been argued as particularly likely for the provinces of Kent, Lindsey, Deira and Bernicia, all of whose names derive from Romano-British tribal or district names.

The southern and east coasts were, of course, the areas settled first and in greatest numbers by the settlers and so presumably were the earliest to pass from Romano-British to Anglo-Saxon control. Once established they had the advantage of easy communication with continental territories in Europe via the North Sea or the Channel. The east and south coast provinces may never have fragmented to the extent of some areas inland and by the end of the sixth century they were already beginning to expand by annexing smaller neighbours. Barbara Yorke suggests that such aggressiveness must have encouraged areas which did not already possess military protection in the form of kings and their armies to acquire their own war-leaders or protection alliances. By the time of the Tribal Hidage there were also two large 'inland' kingdoms, those of the Mercians and West Saxons, whose spectacular growth we can trace in par in our sources for the seventh century, but it is not clear how far this expansion had proceeded by the end of the sixth century.

What Bede seems to imply in his Bretwalda list of the elite is the ability to extract tribute and overawe and/or protect communities, which may well have been relatively short-lived in any one instance, but ostensibly "Anglo-Saxon" dynasties variously replaced one another in this role in a discontinuous but influential and potent roll call of warrior elites, with very few interruptions from other "British" warlords. The success of this elite was felt beyond their geography, to include neighbouring British territories in the centre and west of what later became England, and even the far west of the island. Again, Bede was very clear that English imperium could on occasion encompass British and English kingships alike, and that Britons and Angles marched to war together in the early seventh century, under both British and English kings. It is Bede who provides the most vivid picture of a late sixth- and early seventh-century Anglian warlord in action, in the person of Æthelfrith of Northumbria, King of Bernicia (a kingdom with a non-English name), who rapidly built up a personal 'empire' by military victories over the Britons of the North, the Scots of Dalriada, the Angles of Deira and the Britons of north-eastern Wales, only ultimately to experience disaster at the hands of Rædwald of East Anglia.

Rural freedoms and kinship groups
Where arable cultivation continued in early Anglo-Saxon England, there seems to have been considerable continuity with the Roman period in both field layout and arable practices, although we do not know whether there were also changes to patterns of tenure or the regulation of cultivation. The greatest perceptible alterations in land usage between about AD 400 and 600 are therefore in the proportions of the land of each community that lay under grass or the plough, rather than in changes to the layout or management of arable fields.

The Anglo-Saxons settled in small groups covering a handful of widely dispersed local communities. These farms were for the most part mobile. This mobility, which was typical across much of Northern Europe took two forms: the gradual shifting of the settlement within its boundaries or the complete relocation of the settlement. These shifting settlements (called Wandersiedlungen or "wandering settlements") were a common feature since the Bronze Age. Why farms became abandoned and then relocated is much debated. However it is suggested that this might be related to the death of a patron of the family or the desire to move to better farmlands.

These farms are often falsely supposed to be "peasant farms". However, a ceorl, who was the lowest ranking freeman in early Anglo-Saxon society, was not a peasant but an arms-owning male with access to law, support of a kindred and the wergild, situated at the apex of an extended household working at least one hide of land. It is the ceorl that we should associate with the standard  x  post-hole building of the early Anglo-Saxon period, grouped with others of the same kin group. Each such household head had a number of less-free dependants and slaves.

The success of the rural world in the 5th and 6th centuries, according to the landscape archaeology, was due to three factors: the continuity with the past, with no evidence of up-rooting in the landscape; farmers' freedom and rights over lands, with provision of a rent or duty to an overlord, who provided only slight lordly input; and the common outfield arable land (of an outfield-infield system) that provided the ability to build kinship and group cultural ties.

Material culture
The origins of the timber building tradition seen in early Anglo-Saxon England have generated much debate which has mirrored a wider debate about the cultural affinities of Anglo-Saxon material culture.

Philip Rahtz asserted that buildings seen in West Stow and Mucking had late Roman origins. Archaeologist Philip Dixon noted the striking similarity between Anglo-Saxon timber halls and Romano-British rural houses. The Anglo-Saxons did not import the 'long-house', the traditional dwelling of the continental Germanic peoples, to Britain. Instead they upheld a local vernacular British building tradition dating back to the late first century. This has been interpreted as evidence of the endurance of kinship and household structures from the Roman into the Anglo-Saxon period.

However, this has been considered too neat an explanation for all the evidence. Anne and Gary Marshall summarise the situation:
"One of the main problems in Anglo-Saxon archaeology has been to account for the apparent uniqueness of the English timber structures of the period. These structures seem to bear little resemblance either to earlier Romano-British or to continental models. In essence, the problem is that the hybrid Anglo-Saxon style seems to appear full-blown with no examples of development from the two potentially ancestral traditions ... The consensus of the published work was that the Anglo-Saxon building style was predominantly home-grown."

In the Sutton Hoo burial, perhaps that of the East Anglian king Raedwald, a long and complex iron chain, used for suspending a cauldron from the beams of a hall, was found. It was the product of a continuous British smithing tradition dating to pre-Roman times. This was, however, a high-status object.

For Bryan Ward-Perkins the answer to the relative lack of native influence on everyday objects is found in the success of the Anglo-Saxon culture and highlights the micro-diversity and larger cohesion that produced a dynamic force in comparison to the Brittonic culture. From beads and quoits to clothes and houses, there is something unique happening in the early Anglo-Saxon period. The material culture evidence shows that people adopted and adapted styles based on set roles and styles. John Hines, commenting on the diversity of nearly a thousand glass beads and many different clothes clasps from Lakenheath, states that these reveal a "society where people relied on others to fulfill a role" and "what they had around them was making a statement", not one about the individual, but about "identity between small groups not within small groups".

Julian Richards commenting on this and other evidence suggests: 
"[The Anglo-Saxon settlement of Britain] was more complex than a mass invasion bringing fully formed lifestyles and beliefs. The early Anglo-Saxon, just like today's migrants, were probably riding different cultural identities. They brought from their homelands the traditions of their ancestors. But they would have been trying to work out not only who they were, but who they wanted to be ... and forge an identity for those who followed."

Looking beyond simplistic 'homeland' scenarios, and explaining the observations that 'Anglo-Saxon' houses and other aspects of material culture do not find exact matches in the 'Germanic homelands' in Europe, Halsall explains the changes within the context of a larger 'North Sea interaction zone', including lowland England, Northern Gaul and northern Germany. These areas experienced marked social and cultural changes in the wake of Roman collapse—experienced not only within the former Roman provinces (Gaul, Britain) but also in Barbaricum itself. All three areas experienced changes in social structure, settlement patterns and ways of expressing identities, as well as tensions which created push and pull factors for migrations in, perhaps, multiple directions.

Culture of belief
The study of pagan religious practice in the early Anglo-Saxon period is difficult. Most of the texts that may contain relevant information are not contemporary, but written later by Christian writers who tended to have a hostile attitude to pre-Christian beliefs, and who may have distorted their portrayal of them. Much of the information used to reconstruct Anglo-Saxon paganism comes from later Scandinavian and Icelandic texts and there is a debate about how relevant these are. The study of pagan Anglo-Saxon beliefs has often been approached with reference to Roman or even Greek typologies and categories. Archaeologists therefore use such terms as gods, myths, temples, sanctuaries, priests, magic and cults. Charlotte Behr argues that this provides a worldview of Anglo-Saxon practice culture which is unhelpful.

Peter Brown employed a new method of looking at the belief systems of the fifth to seventh centuries, by arguing for a model of religion which was typified by a pick and choose approach. The period was exceptional because there was no orthodoxy or institutions to control or hinder the people. This freedom of culture is seen also in the Roman-British community and is very evident in the complaints of Gildas.

One Anglo-Saxon cultural practice that is better understood are the burial customs, due in part to archaeological excavations at various sites including Sutton Hoo, Spong Hill, Prittlewell, Snape and Walkington Wold, and the existence of around 1,200 furnished inhumation and cremation cemeteries, which were once assumed to be pagan but whose religious affiliation is now substantially debated in scholarship. There was no set form of burial, with cremation being preferred in the north and inhumation in the south, although both forms were found throughout England, sometimes in the same cemeteries. When cremation did take place, the ashes were usually placed within an urn and then buried, sometimes along with grave goods. According to archaeologist Dave Wilson, "the usual orientation for an inhumation in a pagan Anglo-Saxon cemetery was west–east, with the head to the west, although there were often deviations from this." Indicative of possible religious belief, grave goods were common amongst inhumation burials as well as cremations; free Anglo-Saxon men were buried with at least one weapon in the pagan tradition, often a seax, but sometimes also with a spear, sword, or shield, or a combination of these. There are also a number of recorded cases of parts of animals being buried within such graves. Most common amongst these were body parts belonging to either goats or sheep, although parts of oxen were also relatively common, and there are also isolated cases of goose, crab apples, duck eggs, and hazelnuts being buried in graves. It is widely thought therefore that such items constituted a food source for the deceased. In some cases, animal skulls, particularly oxen but also pig, were buried in human graves, a practice that was also found earlier in Roman Britain.

Despite this earlier confidence in the ability to use burial customs to understand cultures of belief, mortuary archaeologists have now challenged the notion that burial with grave-goods either in post-Roman Britain, or further afield in early medieval Europe, need have anything at all to do with paganism or other forms of belief in the afterlife. Howard Williams, summarising general trends in the scholarship, has pointed out

The emergence of furnished cremation and inhumation graves is thus no longer regarded as reflecting a single and coherent ‘Anglo-Saxon paganism’; nor need the decline in accompanied burial relate directly or exclusively to Christian conversion. Indeed, the very term ‘pagan Anglo-Saxon burial’ compounds the conceptually naïve assumption that there existed a one-to-one correlation between ethnic affiliation, religious beliefs and ritual practice that archaeologists have been so keen to move beyond. 

There is also evidence for the continuation of Christianity in south and east Britain. The Christian shrine at St Albans and its martyr cult survived throughout the period (see Gildas above). There are references in Anglo-Saxon poetry, including Beowulf, that show some interaction between pagan and Christian practices and values. While there is little scholarly focus on this subject, there is enough evidence from Gildas and elsewhere that it is safe to assume some continuing – perhaps more free – form of Christianity survived. Richard Whinder states "(The Church's pre-Augustine) characteristics place it in continuity with the rest of the Christian Church in Europe at that time and, indeed, in continuity with the Catholic faith ... today."
     
Anglo-Saxon paganism was not based on faith, but on rituals intended to bring benefits to individuals and the community. As kingship developed, it probably came into conflict with the entrenched priestly class. Conversion to Christianity provided kings with priests who were under their protection and thus under their influence, and Christianisation seems to have been mainly sponsored by kings.

Language and literature
Little is known about the everyday spoken language of people living in the migration period. Old English is a contact language and  reconstructing the pidgin used in this period from the written language found in the West Saxon literature of some 400 years later is difficult. Two general theories are proposed regarding why people changed their language to Old English (or an early form of such); either a person or household changed so as to serve an elite, or a person or household changed through choice as it provided some advantage economically or legally.

According to Nick Higham, the adoption of the language—as well as the material culture and traditions—of an Anglo-Saxon elite, "by large numbers of the local people seeking to improve their status within the social structure, and undertaking for this purpose rigorous acculturation", is the key to understanding the transition from Romano-British to Anglo-Saxon. The progressive nature of this language acquisition, and the 'retrospective reworking' of kinship ties to the dominant group led, ultimately, to the "myths which tied the entire society to immigration as an explanation of their origins in Britain".
 
The final few lines of the poem "The Battle of Brunanburh", a 10th-century Anglo-Saxon poem that celebrates a victory of Æthelstan, the first king of all the English, give a poetic voice to the English conception of their origins.
 

The orthography chosen by the scribe lacked v, ð/θ and ʃ, these are marked in square brackets after the ambiguous letter chosen.

This 'heroic tradition' of conquering incomers is consistent with the conviction of Bede, and later Anglo-Saxon historians, that the ancestral origin of the English was not the result of any assimilation with the native British, but was derived solely from the Germanic migrants of the post-Roman period. It also explains the enduring appeal of poems and heroic stories such as Beowulf, Wulf and Eadwacer and Judith, well into the Christian period. The success of the language is the most obvious result of the settlement period. This language was not just the language of acculturation, but through its stories, poetry and oral traditions became the agency of change.

Nick Higham has provided this summary of the processes:
"As Bede later implied, language was a key indicator of ethnicity in early England. In circumstances where freedom at law, acceptance with the kindred, access to patronage, and the use or possession of weapons were all exclusive to those who could claim Germanic descent, then speaking Old English without Latin or Brittonic inflection had considerable value."

See also

Notes

Citations

References

General

Archaeology

History

Genetics 
 Gretzinger, J., Sayer, D., Justeau, P. et al. "The Anglo-Saxon migration and the formation of the early English gene pool". In: Nature (21 September 2022). https://doi.org/10.1038/s41586-022-05247-2

Anglo-Saxon society
.
Genetics in the United Kingdom
Invasions of England
5th century in England
6th century in England
7th century in England
Medieval Wales
Migration Period
Scotland in the Early Middle Ages
Sub-Roman Britain
5th century in Great Britain
6th century in Great Britain
7th century in Great Britain